Kanmani  is a 1994 Indian Tamil-language romantic drama film, directed by R. K. Selvamani. The film stars Prashanth and Mohini, while Sujatha, Lakshmi and Jaishankar play supporting roles.

Plot
Prashanth joins S.R.M. Engineering College where he is teased and taunted by the college rowdies, led by Mohini who, among other things, has a video camera in the ladies room to watch women who bathe there!! After a few confrontations Prashanth shows her who's the boss. Meanwhile, Prashanth's sister Lakshmi is a famous criminal lawyer nursing a sad past and wanting revenge against Sujatha, a police officer and her husband Jai Shanker, a judge. She even supports smugglers and represent them in court just to spite Sujatha. One such client of hers is Mansur Ali Khan who is a liquor baron running a medical college (No prizes for guessing who its modeled on). His daughter also pines for Prashanth, and there is this inevitable love triangle. Mohini and Prashanth are soon in love forgetting the initial skirmishes, but suddenly one day Mohini accuses Prashanth of an attempt to molest her. It turns out that she does this to dishonor Prashanth and his sister Lakshmi, as Lakshmi is Sujatha's professional rival. After a few such confrontations, Lakshmi decides to get Prashanth married to Mansur Ali Khan's daughter. But suddenly Prashanth has a change of heart as Mohini threatens to commit suicide, but gives in to his sister's wishes.

On the day of the wedding, Jai Shanker confronts Lakshmi and reveals that Mohini is indeed Lakshmi's daughter. Lakshmi and Jai Shanker were originally in love but due to the manipulation of Sujatha's father, Vinu Chakarvarthy, Jai Shanker is forced to marry her, instead of Lakshmi. But Mansur Ali Khan refuses to give in and the usual fight and chase ensues and in the end, the differences are resolved and the lovers are united.

Cast
Prashanth as Raja
Mohini as Kanmani
Jaishankar as Rajasekaran
Sujatha as Rajalakshmi
Lakshmi as Gayatri
 Subhashri as Radha
Mansoor Ali Khan
Thyagu

Reception
Indolink's  critic noted, "though not very convincing and as powerful a story as he might have intended this to be, R. K. Selvamani still manages to keep one engrossed for most of the time with a narration sans hitches." New Straits Times called it "just another love story, big on bare flesh appeal".

Soundtrack
The music was composed by Ilaiyaraaja. Except for one song "Netru Vandha Kaatru" which was composed by Ilayaraja's son Karthik Raja. Karthik later remade this song as "Aaj Main Khush Hoon" for Hindi film Grahan.

References

External links
 

1994 films
Films scored by Ilaiyaraaja
1990s Tamil-language films
Films directed by R. K. Selvamani
1994 romantic drama films
Indian romantic drama films